"Hello (Turn Your Radio On)" is a song by British-based pop duo Shakespears Sister, and was released as the fourth single from their second album, Hormonally Yours. The single peaked at number 14 and spent six weeks on the UK Singles Chart. Internationally, the single peaked within the top 40 in Germany, Ireland, the Netherlands, Sweden, and Switzerland.

Background
The single was released in the UK on 26 October 1992. The album version of the song was remixed for its single release, featuring more bass and adding drums.  The single version is also slightly extended, with a repeat of the chorus towards the end of the song. The single sleeve artwork was created by Laurence Dunmore, with photography by Derek Ridgers.

Critical reception
Tom Demalon from AllMusic described the song as a "stellar glam-tinged ballad with a dreamy chorus". Larry Flick from Billboard called it a "Beatles-esque rock ballad." He added, "A soft, rolling piano line is surrounded by deep alto harmonies and nimble guitars. Booming, swaying, and completely memorable chorus is icing on the cake." The Daily Vault's Michael R. Smith stated in his album review, that "the spellbinding grand finale of "Hello (Turn Your Radio On)" is just icing on the cake." A reviewer from Liverpool Echo wrote, "Songs that mention the radio always do well on the radio. It's because DJs are so big-headed. But this one - a re-mixed track from the Hormonally Yours album - does sound good on radio." Pan-European magazine Music & Media commented, "Hello out there in radio land, stay for a while for another ballad by the hippest sisters around." Pop Rescue said it is a "great" track.

Music video
The accompanying music video for "Hello (Turn Your Radio On)" was directed by British director Sophie Muller and is made in black-and-white as an old movie. It depicts the duo performing inside what appears to be a closet that is being opened in the beginning and closed at the end of the video.

Track listings

 7-inch single and cassette
 "Hello (Turn Your Radio On)" (7-inch version) — 4:24
 "Stay" (André Betts remix) — 4:28

 UK limited-edition CD single
 "Hello (Turn Your Radio On)" (7-inch version) — 4:23
 "Hello (Turn Your Radio On)" (alternative piano version) — 4:23
 "Hello (Turn Your Radio On)" (album version) — 4:06
 "Stay" (André Betts remix)  — 3:49

 UK CD single
 "Hello (Turn Your Radio On)" — 4:24
 "Black Sky" (Dub Extravaganza Part 2) — 10:39
 "Goodbye Cruel World" (BTO remix) — 7:06
 "Stay (André Betts 12-inch remix) — 4:28

 European and Australasian CD single
 "Hello (Turn Your Radio On)" (7-inch version) — 4:23
 "Hello (Turn Your Radio On)" (alternative piano version) — 4:23
 "Goodbye Cruel World" (BTO remix) — 7:06
 "Stay" (André Betts remix)  — 3:49

Charts

Weekly charts

Year-end charts

Cover versions

The Bates version

"Hello (Turn Your Radio On)" was covered by German punk band the Bates, and was released as the group's lead single in 1994.

Track listing
 CD single
 "Hello" – 3:21
 "All in All" – 2:28
 "It's a Heartache" (Punch in the Face demo mix) – 1:52
 "Hello" (Punch in the Face demo mix) – 3:14
 "Worse Than the Devil" (Punch in the Face demo mix) – 1:51

Queensberry version

"Hello (Turn Your Radio On)" was covered by German girlgroup Queensberry, and released as the lead single off the second album On My Own in October 2009.

Track listing
 CD single
 "Hello (Turn Your Radio On)" – 3:18
 "Welcome to My World" (written by Andrew Bojanic, Elizabeth Hooper, Jim Marr, Wendy Page) – 3:46

Charts

References

1990s ballads
1992 singles
1992 songs
2009 singles
Black-and-white music videos
London Records singles
Music videos directed by Sophie Muller
Queensberry (band) songs
Rock ballads
Shakespears Sister songs
Songs about radio
Songs written by David A. Stewart
Songs written by Marcella Detroit
Songs written by Siobhan Fahey
Virgin Records singles
Warner Records singles